Retail media is marketing to consumers at or near their point of purchase, or point of choice between competing brands or products. Common techniques include in-store advertising, online advertising, sampling, loyalty cards and coupons or vouchers.

The planning and use of retail media is a key component in the delivery of shopper marketing campaigns.

Retail media channels have become established as important for promoting goods and services at or near or even further beyond the points of purchase and consumption. Retail media is now being taken more seriously by most traditional media agencies.

Retail media originated as media available within the retail environment. This has now developed into a media discipline in its own right as new retail media channels have been added. Retail media now reaches outside the retail environment to encompass media channels such loyalty program marketing, coupons and door drops, fleet media (retailer's fleet vehicles, etc.).

Though many retail media channels are found inside the retailer's store/environment, the media channels themselves are not always "owned" or operated by retailers. Many retail media channels are operated independently by specialist media companies who also manage other media outside the retail environment.

Context and targeting
Retail media channels are to a large extent defined by the context of the retailer. The majority of retail media channels reach their audience at or near the point of purchase or point of choice. Research suggests media placed at or near the points of choice/purchase can have a significant impact on purchasing decisions (PoS).1 Media owners and agencies have learnt more in recent years about the value of retail media channels.

There is potential for conflict of interest between the retailer selling the media and the CPG/FMCG buying the media, which is why retailers often engage a third-party media owner to operate and sell media space on their behalf.

Challenges
 Audience measures: There are several methods for evaluating the audience for retail media, whether total footfall, segmented audiences or sales uplift attributed to retail media channels.
 Buying process: Dependent on the retailer, product, sales cycle and retail media channel, and other concerns, there are different media sales cycles to fit the particular requirements.

Agencies
Due to the specialized nature of retail media programs, advertisers are increasingly turning to dedicated retail media agencies to facilitate shopper-targeted campaigns.

Retail media agencies help connect retailers such as Walmart and Sam's Club with brands that are interested in presenting their message to consumers while they are navigating the path to purchase.

In the UK, one of the first agencies to specialise in this space was RMI (Retail Marketing International), who developed a "software operating system" known as BASE; a platform used by retailers and CPGs to run their shopper marketing. Other shopper marketing agencies in the UK include: GIG Retail, Result Marketing, and Capture Marketing.
Traditional advertising agencies are beginning to understand the power of shopper marketing, in light of the overall share of traditional marketing budgets being directed more towards "shopper" and "digital" media, away from less efficient and less quantifiable media such as TV, local press, and radio.

Networks
Retail media networks are channels spanning individual retailers or a multitude of retailers. They can range from static posters, point-of-sale material, audio, visual or digital materials, and many things in between. Networks can therefore provide narrowcast and broadcast audience buying solutions. As shoppers spend time in stores, it becomes difficult for them to avoid in-store advertising and this can benefit advertisers, who not only can ensure their campaigns are seen, but that they can also be acted upon, especially if the advertised product is available in the store.

Retail media networks now offer accountability in providing audience measurement techniques in the same way as traditional broadcast or print media.

See also
 Digital signage
 Retail
 Retail design
 Signage
 Visual merchandising

References

The 1995 POPAI Consumer Buying Habits Study (Point-of-Purchase Advertising Institute, Englewood, NJ).
The Arbitron Retail Media Study Volume I: The Impact of Retail Audio Broadcasting (Arbitron).

Advertising
Advertising by medium
New media
Media
Promotion and marketing communications
Retail store elements